Alphonse Jules Alexandre Dugenne was a French colonel who led the Bắc Lệ ambush during the Tonkin Campaign, part of the French effort to capture the territory which would become French Indochina. He was decorated as Officer and Knight of the Legion of Honour.

Biography
Alphonse was born on February 10, 1841, in the Basses-Pyrénées department as the son of Alexandre-Louis Dugenne, the editor of the Mémorial des Pyrénées, and great-grandson of Elie-François Dugenne.

He entered the Saint Cyr military academy (École spéciale militaire de Saint-Cyr) in 1859 and subsequently began his military career.

Dugenne was appointed corporal in October 1860, second lieutenant of the 2nd Foreign Regiment in October 1861, and lieutenant in October 1866. On April 10, 1867, he was moved to the 81st Infantry Regiment. He was promoted to captain in March 1870, and served from November 20, 1870 in the 52nd Infantry Regiment. On December 18, he became senior battalion commander of the Garde mobile de la Haute-Loire, moved to the 21st Provisional Regiment on April 13, 1871, and was laid off by redundancy on May 29, 1871. Appointed Captain on November 31, 1871, he served from April 23, 1872 at 64th Infantry Regiment and then from February 17, 1873 as part of the 1st Foreign Regiment.

He was appointed to the 2nd African Light Infantry Battalion on May 22, 1884, arriving in Tonkin later that year. At the beginning of June, he inflicted bloody losses to the bands of pirates around the Dong Trien. He received four wounds in Hong-Hoa. On March 29, 1885, he became Lieutenant Colonel in the 107th Infantry Regiment, then on February 6, 1886, in the 11th Infantry Regiment and on February 10, 1886, in the 51st Infantry Regiment. On February 10, 1886, he served in the 11th Infantry Regiment, then on July 1, 1887 was appointed Colonel in the 17th Infantry Regiment, then transferred to the 88th Infantry Regiment.

Bắc Lệ Ambush

On June 23, after the signing of the Tientsin Accord on June 3, 1884, Dugenne led a column of 800 French troops towards Langson. He encountered several thousand Chinese troops who opposed his passage. Dugenne sent a parliamentarian bearing a letter announcing that, having no order, he asks the commander of the French column to have one given to him by Peking.

Dugenne, who was described as an energetic character, very hot-tempered, tall, thin, sanguine and bilious, unfit for the slightest diplomacy but capable of breaking everything at the risk of breaking himself, revealed that he had orders to go to Langson and that, in three hours, he would continue on his way .

At the appointed time, he crossed the Thương River, but was turned back by the Chinese. Forced to make a retreat, he called Captain Maillard: 

When night came, in his rudimentary headquarters and under fire, Dugenne wrote a dispatch to the general-in-chief; the dispatch finished and the meal taken, the colonel took the lantern and placed it under his seat, saying: "You have been shooting at the head long enough, brigands, so shoot now."

It was Lieutenant of the Marine Infantry Bailly, in charge of optical telegraphy, who was instructed to try, from a hill on the left bank, to warn the French headquarters in Hanoi of the situation of the column. The light caught the attention of the Chinese, who rained a hail of bullets down the hill, but salvo fires made them believe that it was occupied by important forces. As such, the Chinese did not engage, which enabled the "audacious" volunteers to regain the bulk of the column safe and sound, and continue their retreat in relative safety. The forces then arrived at Cau-son on June 30.

Final Years
Dugenne was later recalled to France in September. He was sent to Formosa (now Taiwan) at the beginning of 1885 and returned to Tonkin.

He was appointed colonel in July 1887, he commanded the marching regiment of the French Foreign Legion and the circle of the 11th military region. He returned to France in May 1887, passing his command to Commander Diguet.

He then returned again to Tonkin after a brief visit to France and he died during a column of operations between the Thương River and the Cầu River against the caï Kinh le December 20, 1887,  few kilometres north of Tin-Dao in the territory of Monkayo, from the rupture of an aneurysm. He was buried in Phu Lang Thuong.

References

People from Pau, Pyrénées-Atlantiques
French military personnel of the Second French intervention in Mexico
French military personnel of the Franco-Prussian War
French military personnel of the Sino-French War
People of the Tonkin campaign
1841 births
1887 deaths
Officiers of the Légion d'honneur
Chevaliers of the Légion d'honneur